Tynedale FM was the call sign of Tynedale Community Radio based in Hexham in Northumberland. The project grew from concept in March 2008 to fruition later that year, thanks to volunteers who put together the station for its first Trial Broadcast Ofcom RSL Licence 28 November 2008 to 24 December 2008 on 87.7 FM. A second RSL was in mid-2009.

Located in the former Gilesgate Swimming Pool, the station secured a second trial (RSL) broadcast in summer 2009. Working practices became unsustainable, with a significant change of personnel shortly afterwards.
A move was made to the Queens Hall centre in late 2010 where a studio was set up in the basement and streaming went on line via Sun FM. The studio, although free, was not practical and the station moved to a site in the now converted "old swimming pool" of the grammar school.

References

External links 
Tynedale FM

Community radio stations in the United Kingdom
Radio stations in North East England